MAW may refer to:
 Malawi, a republic in southeast Africa
 Make-A-Wish Foundation, a U.S. charity
 Marine Aircraft Wing, the largest aviation unit in the United States Marine Corps
 Masters at Work, the house music producers "Little" Louie Vega and Kenny "Dope" González
 Men at Work, an Australian pop band
 Mexican–American War, between the U.S. and Mexico in 1846–1848
 Missile approach warning system, aircraft equipment to detect an approaching anti-aircraft missile
 Mission Adaptive Wing, Adaptive compliant wing for aircraft which can change form
 Modified Atlantic Water, water flowing from the Atlantic Ocean into the Mediterranean through the Alboran Sea

See also
 Maw (disambiguation)